Eline De Smedt (born 10 February 1998) is a Belgian female acrobatic gymnast. With partner Nikki Snel, Eline De Smedt achieved gold in the 2014 Acrobatic Gymnastics World Championships.

References

External links

 

1998 births
Living people
Belgian acrobatic gymnasts
Female acrobatic gymnasts
Medalists at the Acrobatic Gymnastics World Championships